St George's School, Harpenden (also known as St George's) is a non-selective state day and boarding school in Harpenden, Hertfordshire, England, educating students of both sexes between the ages of eleven and eighteen, with an emphasis on its Christian ethos. It was founded in 1907 as one of Britain's first mixed-sex boarding schools. The school has International School status. The School was named as the Sunday Times' 'Comprehensive School of the Year' in 2019. In 2022, the School was ranked as the 122nd best secondary state school in the country based on combined GCSE attainment and A-Level point scores.

History 
The school was founded in 1907 by Reverend Cecil Grant, having relocated his school southwards from Keswick, Cumbria in the Lake District to the site of previous school.

In 1898 Grant, who was interested in co-education, was appointed the first headmaster of the newly reopened Keswick School. Along with Bedales School the school was the first co-educational day/boarding school in England. After a number of years, difficulties with the local authority and lack of a chapel prompted a move. The Harpenden site was discovered by one of the masters, a new limited company formed and Grant together with 59 boys and girls and many of the staff moved there. The new school where pupils could live in an atmosphere closely related to family life, based on sound Christian principles was officially opened in 21 June 1907.

The Harpenden site had previously been home to a boarding school for 100 boys founded by Rev. Wix in 1887. A chapel was added in 1891 and a swimming pool in 1894. The school experienced a drop in numbers, with several masters and pupils leaving, and closed in 1904. The site was briefly leased to a branch of the United Services College.

In 1916 Grant founded a separate Montessori unit for pupils from 2 to 8 years of age. The initial location is unclear, but in 1924 moved to Kingston Lodge, adjacent to the school grounds. (Kingston Lodge later became Goddard House is now the music school.) In 1932 the school was renamed to St George's Children's House to attract larger numbers. Its business interests were formally merged with the main school from 1949. In 1955 it broke ties with St George's and moved to Gorselands near Harpenden common.

Grant retired in 1936 and A. H. Watts took over as headmaster, leading the school through the war years. Houses of the school were named after both men as well as Monk and Goddard, old Georgians who had died in the First World War. Names of the boarding houses: Crosthwaite, Keswick and Skiddaw come from locations near the Cumbrian school.

In 1967 the school became a voluntary aided school under Hertfordshire County Council, initially as a Grammar School and
then as a Comprehensive School in the mid 1970's. This period saw a large expansion of the school with many new buildings and numbers expanding to 800. On 1 July 2012 St George's became an academy, funded by the new St George's School Harpenden Academy Trust. It continues to be supported by the Cecil Grant Founder's Trust, a charity set up after Grant's death in 1946.

The St. George's motto Levavi Oculos (Aim Higher) appears on the uniform badges. It derives from their School Hymn, Assurgit, which is sung in Latin. Levavi Oculos means "I have lifted up mine eyes" and alludes to Psalm 121, beginning "I will lift up mine eyes unto the hills, from whence cometh my help; my help cometh even from the Lord, who hath made Heaven and Earth." In the sense of "I have raised my sights" this is equivalent to the English motto Aim Higher, which appears over one archway at the front entrance of Keswick House.

Christian ethos 
Admission to the school for day students is based mainly on location of students' homes, with students coming from many of the surrounding towns and villages. Regular attendance at a local church is required; however, the school itself is non-denominational and does not receive funding from any religious group or church.

The school is centred on a late-nineteenth-century chapel, which is led by a resident chaplain and supported by a part-time organist.

House system 
The school is split into four day houses: Grant (green), Watts (yellow), Monk (blue) and Goddard (red), respectively named after Rev. Cecil Grant, the founder of the school, Dr. Arthur Watts, the second headmaster,  and Bertram Monk and Lister Goddard, two former pupils who died in the Great War.

Academics
In 2019 St George's was ranked third in examination results in the country for state schools and rivals some of the private schools. Its academic Sixth Form has the third highest progress score in the county, beating almost all local Independent Schools  (Including St Alban’s School and Haberdashers' Aske's Boys' School).

In 2014 it received an Outstanding Ofsted rating. It has a Progress 8 measure of 0.95 which is well above average.

Extra-curricular activities
The school music department (via on-site tuition company Musicale) offer peripatetic instrumental tuition for all woodwind, string and brass instruments as well as classical and jazz piano, guitar, drums and voice. Regular concerts take place in the chapel and the old library. During the autumn term each year, the Music Department collaborate with the Drama and Performing Arts Department to produce a whole school production. The Drama Department also host an 'Inter-House Drama Festival', which is adjudicated by a professional actor, and a lower-school drama production.

In 1939 St George's School won the first National Schools Sevens tournament and has continued this Rugby success producing Rugby Sevens and Rugby Union internationals. The Rugby teams continue this legacy today producing many England Under-18 and Under-16 Rugby Players.

The school is notable for having first fielded the English national players Owen Farrell and Maro Itoje, alongside two other members of England's rugby union team (as of 2019).

Until September 2019, house points cumulated via means of various events would form an overall tally and the winning house be awarded the Chapman Cup.

The Chapman Cup has since been re-named.

Boarding 

Keswick and Crosthwaite House provide boarding accommodation for girl and boy boarders respectively.

St George's was one of the first schools in Britain to provide mixed-sex boarding education.

Old Georgians 

Distinguished members of the schools alumni, known as 'Old Georgians' include;

References

Further reading

External links

St George's School website

Educational institutions established in 1907
Boarding schools in Hertfordshire
State funded boarding schools in England
Secondary schools in Hertfordshire
Harpenden
1907 establishments in England
Academies in Hertfordshire